Ligia Elena Hernández Frías (born April 5, 1985 in Punto Fijo, Venezuela, and grew up in Maracay, Venezuela), is a pageant titleholder. She was represented the Aragua state in the Miss Venezuela 2008 pageant, on September 10, 2008, and placed in the ten semifinalists.

She represented Venezuela in the 2008 Reina Hispanoamericana pageant, in Santa Cruz, Bolivia, on October 30, 2008, and won the title of 4th runner up. She also won the special prizes of Miss Photogenic and Miss Elegance.

References

External links
Miss Venezuela Official Website
Miss Venezuela La Nueva Era MB

1985 births
Living people
People from Maracay
Venezuelan female models